Songs is a compilation of well-known songs by American singer-songwriter Rich Mullins, released on July 30, 1996. It was the last album to be released by Mullins before his death in a car accident on September 19, 1997. A follow-up hits compilation, Songs 2, was released in 1999.

The album featured three new recordings: new versions of the previously recorded songs "Sing Your Praise to the Lord" and "Elijah", and a brand new track, "We Are Not as Strong as We Think We Are". In addition, the album featured the full-length radio single version of "Screen Door", which had been commercially unavailable prior to this release.

In 2001, Songs was certified as a Gold record (500,000 units sold) by the RIAA.

The album was nominated for "Recorded Music Packaging" of the year at the 1997 Dove Awards.

Track listing

Personnel (new songs) 

 Rich Mullins – lead vocals 
 Reed Arvin – acoustic piano, string arrangements (1)
 Blair Masters – keyboards
 Jerry McPherson – guitars 
 David Cleveland – additional guitars (1, 9)
 Kenny Greenberg – additional guitars (5)
 Mark Hill – bass 
 Chris McHugh – drums
 Carl Gorodetzky – string contractor (1)
 Lisa Cochran – backing vocals 
 Michael Mellett – backing vocals 

Production
 Reed Arvin – producer (1–7, 9–16), additional engineer (1, 5, 9)
 Rich Mullins – producer (8)
 The Ragamuffin Band – producers (8)
 Don Donahue – executive producer 
 Tom Laune – engineer (1, 5, 9), mixing (1, 5, 9)
 Doug Sarrett – string engineer (1), additional engineer (1, 5, 9)
 Hank Williams – mastering at MasterMix, Nashville, Tennessee
 James Waddell – production assistant 
 Diana Lussenden – art direction, design 
 Ben Pearson – photography 
 Recorded at OmniSound Studios, Nashville, Tennessee
 Engineered and Mixed at Battery Studios, Nashville, Tennessee

References 

Albums produced by Reed Arvin
1996 compilation albums
Rich Mullins albums